Bendor Gerard Robert Grosvenor (born 27 November 1977) is a British art historian, writer and former art dealer. He is known for discovering a number of important lost artworks by Old Master artists, including Sir Peter Paul Rubens, Claude Lorrain and Peter Brueghel the Younger. As a dealer he specialised in Old Masters, with a particular interest in Anthony van Dyck.

From 2011 to 2016 he carried out specialist research for, and appeared in, the BBC1 art programme Fake or Fortune?. He now presents, with Emma Dabiri (Jacky Klein in Series 1), the BBC4 series Britain's Lost Masterpieces, which began in 2016.

Life and work

Grosvenor was born on 27 November 1977 in London. His parents are Hon. Richard Alexander Grosvenor and Gabriella Grosvenor. He was educated at Harrow School before attending the University of East Anglia for his BA Hons. He then received an MPhil from Pembroke College, Cambridge and a DPhil from the University of East Anglia. His PhD thesis was entitled "The Politics of Foreign Policy: Lord Derby and the Eastern Crisis, 1875-8". Before becoming an art historian he worked in politics as an adviser, first to the Labour MP Tony Banks, Lord Stratford, then to the Conservative MP Hugo Swire.

His first major art discovery was a mis-catalogued portrait by Sir Thomas Lawrence being sold at a London auction in 2003 as a work by Lawrence's pupil George Henry Harlow. From 2005 until 2014, he worked for Philip Mould Ltd, where he made a number of significant art historical discoveries, including lost works by artists such as Sir Joshua Reynolds, Thomas Gainsborough, and Sir Anthony van Dyck, on whom he is an acknowledged specialist. In 2016 he sold a newly identified portrait by Joan Carlile, the first professional British female artist, to the Tate gallery.

In 2017, he discovered the "lost portrait" of George Villiers, 1st Duke of Buckingham at Pollok House, Glasgow, Scotland. The painting was thought to be a copy of a painting by Flemish artist Peter Paul Rubens that had been lost for nearly 400 years, but after restoration was found to be the original by Rubens.

Grosvenor has been a member of the Lord Chancellor's Advisory Council on National Records and Archives, and the Lord Chancellor's Forum for Historical Manuscripts and Academic Research. He also works as a journalist and writer, and presents programmes for BBC2's The Culture Show.

He was diagnosed with autism spectrum disorder as an adult and has advocated improved accessibility at museums. In 2015, he married Ishbel Hall and he has one daughter and two step-sons.

Jacobite portraiture
Grosvenor has made a special study of Jacobite portraiture. In 2009 he proved the Scottish National Portrait Gallery's iconic portrait of Charles Edward Stuart by Maurice Quentin de La Tour was in fact a portrait of Charles' brother Henry Benedict Stuart, Cardinal Duke of York.

In 2013 he discovered the lost portrait of Charles Edward Stuart by Scottish artist Allan Ramsay at Gosford House, the home of the Earl of Wemyss near Edinburgh. This portrait is now on display at the Scottish National Portrait Gallery, and has taken the place of the La Tour pastel as the definitive portrait of Charles.

Ancestry
The name Bendor is derived from the Grosvenor family's medieval heraldic shield, a bend or, a golden bend (diagonal stripe), which they used until 1389, when it was claimed instead by the Scrope family in the case Scrope v Grosvenor. The 2nd Duke of Westminster was nicknamed "Bendor".

Grosvenor is a grandson of Robert Grosvenor, 5th Baron Ebury, and fifth cousin of Hugh Grosvenor, 7th Duke of Westminster. He is also of Swiss and Dutch heritage. His father's eldest half-brother is Francis Grosvenor, 8th Earl of Wilton.

Publications

Filmography
Britain's Lost Masterpieces (2016)
Fake or Fortune? (2011-2016)
The Lost Portrait of Bonnie Prince Charlie: A Culture Show Special (2014)
The Culture Show - Venice: A Tale of Two Cities (2013)

References

External links 
Art History News, run by Bendor Grosvenor

1977 births
Living people
People educated at Harrow School
Alumni of Pembroke College, Cambridge
Alumni of the University of East Anglia
English art dealers
BBC people
Fake or Fortune?
Bendor
People from Westminster